Kenneth Daniel Crawford  (October 31, 1894 – November 11, 1976) was a Major League Baseball player for the Federal League Baltimore Terrapins. He also attended the University of Pittsburgh.

External links
Baseball Reference

1894 births
1976 deaths
Major League Baseball first basemen
Baltimore Terrapins players